Transformers: The Ride 3D (or simply Transformers: The Ride and Transformers: Battle for the AllSparks) is a 3D dark ride located at Universal Studios Singapore, Universal Studios Hollywood, Universal Studios Florida and Universal Studios Beijing. The ride, based on the Transformers film franchise, was designed by Universal Creative, Oceaneering International, and Industrial Light & Magic. Each installation is reported to have cost US$100 million. Universal Studios Singapore was the first to open the ride.

The dark ride consists of motion platform-mounted vehicles which follow a  track.

History

Announcements
Early planning and design for the ride began in 2007. In October 2008, Universal Parks & Resorts announced the addition of Transformers: The Ride to their Singapore and Hollywood theme parks. At the time of the announcement, speculation that the ride would feature an upgraded version of the ride system used in The Amazing Adventures of Spider-Man ride at Islands of Adventure appeared in the press. After the two attractions at Universal Studios Singapore and Hollywood were opened, Universal Orlando Resort announced on 1 November 2012, that Transformers: The Ride would open at Universal Studios Florida in mid-2013. The announcement was made just prior to that night's showing of Universal's Cinematic Spectacular: 100 Years of Movie Memories.

Universal Studios Singapore
Construction started in Singapore in late 2009 in a back-of-house location. Construction continued throughout the soft opening period of the park, which began on 18 March 2010. By October 2010, some of the track for the ride had been installed. It was discovered that the ride will be spread across two levels. On 27 October 2011, Universal Studios Singapore announced that Transformers: The Ride would open in Singapore on 3 December 2011.

On 19 November 2011, Universal Studios Singapore opened the ride to the public for "technical rehearsals"; the ride operated intermittently until the official opening date. The ride debuted at an exclusive evening event on 2 December 2011, attended by director Michael Bay and Universal Parks & Resorts CEO Tom Williams. The ride officially opened to the public on 3 December 2011.

Universal Studios Hollywood

Installation of Transformers: The Ride at Universal Studios Hollywood, required the removal of two attractions. On 11 April 2010, Backdraft and Special Effects Stages closed. The Special Effects Stages were relocated to the Upper Lot and renamed the Special Effects Stage on 26 June 2010. Work began almost immediately on the construction of the ride. After a period of construction spanning close to two years, the ride and its gift store, the Transformers Supply Vault, soft opened to the public in late April 2012. Transformers: The Ride officially opened to the public on 24 May 2012.

Universal Studios Florida
A few days after Transformers: The Ride opened at Universal Studios Hollywood, Universal Parks & Resorts decided to open the attraction at Universal Studios Florida. Construction began almost immediately on the site of Soundstage 44, which was once home of Hercules and Xena: Wizards of the Screen and Murder, She Wrote Mystery Theatre. The soundstage was demolished in June 2012. In July 2012, construction of a new building began with the installation of a tower crane and the start of excavation. On 2 May 2013, the park announced that the ride would open on 20 June 2013. On 30 May 2013, technical rehearsals for the ride officially began. On 20 June 2013, the ride officially opened to the general public. Transformers: The Ride 3D celebrated its One-Millionth Rider in August 2013.

Universal Studios Beijing

Ride system and experience

The ride vehicles, developed by Oceaneering International, are mounted to a track-roaming platform that provides the forward motion to move the vehicle through each show scene. The yaw motor and a stewart platform with six degrees of freedom attaching it to the platform allows the vehicle to move 360 degrees at different angles along the  track. Each vehicle is fitted with a motor that controls the right side door through which guests board and leave. These vehicles are modeled after an Autobot named Evac and each vehicle accommodates twelve riders. Each row of four riders is restrained by a single lap bar.

Queue and pre-show

Riders enter the queue from the Sci-Fi City themed area of Universal Studios Singapore, the Lower Lot at Universal Studios Hollywood, Production Central at Universal Studios Florida  or Transformers: Metrobase at Universial Studios Beijing.  The first portion of the queue is a large collection of switchbacks. The later part of the queue is themed as a Nonbiological Extraterrestrial Species Treaty (NEST) base.

A series of signs and video screens are located within this area. The video screens play briefings from General Morshower, Ironhide, Wheelie and Ratchet, who explain that the Decepticons have come to Earth in search of the AllSpark and are attacking the NEST base in order to recover the fragment stored there. Optimus Prime concludes the briefing by introducing all of the Autobots that are featured in the ride. Towards the end of the queue, guests are given a pair of 3D glasses. Once guests arrive at the loading station, they are grouped and loaded into a ride vehicle modeled on an Autobot named Evac, whose mission is to take the AllSpark to safety with navigational help from a squad of NEST recruits (the riders).

Ride

The ride begins with Evac (voiced by Dustin James Leighton) moving out of the loading station and making a turn. Evac approaches the first of thirteen 3D high-definition video screens which depicts Ravage grabbing a canister containing the AllSpark. Evac spins 180° to face the second screen on which Bumblebee is fighting Sideways for the AllSpark, which ends up in Evac's possession.

Evac reverses into one of two elevator shafts which ascend to the second level of the attraction. During the ascent Optimus Prime battles Megatron and Grindor chases Evac who is furiously heading in reverse until Grindor's arm is broken off by a train. Megatron grabs Evac and the two struggle until Megatron breaks a water pipe, which sprays riders with water. Evac enters a dead end pathway before reversing and turning to face another 3D screen, which shows Megatron firing a missile at Evac while continuing to fight Optimus.

Hot air and fog generate the illusion of an explosion. Evac then heads through the hole in a building which was caused by the explosion. Inside lies Devastator, who is trying to suck everything out of the building. Ratchet and Ironhide open fire at Devastator while Evac reverses to escape the suction and continues moving when Devastator stops. Here the Autobot Sideswipe helps in the battle against the Decepticon Bonecrusher. Devastator returns to the scene with the vortex opened. Evac activates his "battle shields" and pulls himself through it. Once ejected from Devastator's "behind", Evac is caught by Starscream from his grappling hook-like tool. Starscream then throws him across several city blocks before landing on a construction site and smashing into some drums which release clouds of fog resulting in Evac asking if the riders are okay. Optimus Prime and Megatron continue their battle in the construction site as Evac reverses away in an attempt to protect the AllSpark. Starscream appears for a second time but is chased away by two NEST helicopters.

Evac then rotates to another section where Megatron then appears, reaching out for Evac. He is then foiled by Optimus who jumps from out of view, tackling Megatron and holding him on the edge of a building, and that's when Evac charges towards Megatron and forces the AllSpark into Megatron's chest causing both to freefall to the ground when Megatron grabs Evac. Bumblebee then saves Evac from destruction while playing James Brown's "I Feel Good" at the verse 'I got you.' Optimus Prime then reports Evac in and acknowledges him on the success of the mission. The last thing guests see before disembarking is the twisted wreckage of Megatron stuck in the ceiling near the exit.

Exit and Transformers Supply Vault

Once the ride is complete, riders dismount the Evac vehicle at the unload station. Upon exiting the ride, guests are greeted with the Transformers Supply Vault gift store, which sells items from the Transformers film franchise, Transformers: The Ride merchandise and a variety of Transformers toys, including a  toy of Evac exclusive to the ride.

Cast
 Glenn Morshower – General Morshower
 Corey Klemow – Theodore Stallworth
 Pilar Holland – Sonya Bradley
 Ezra Masters – Sergeant Dees
 Andrew Arrabito – Military

Voices
 Peter Cullen – Optimus Prime
 Dustin James Leighton – Evac
 Frank Welker – Megatron, Grindor, Ravage, Sideways, Bonecrusher, Devastator
 Charlie Adler – Starscream
 Mark Ryan - Bumblebee
 Robert Foxworth – Ratchet
 Jess Harnell – Ironhide
 Tom Kenny – Wheelie
 James Remar – Sideswipe

Production

Development
Transformers: The Ride was primarily developed by Universal Creative, the research and development division of Universal Parks & Resorts. Universal Creative's Thierry Coup was the Creative Director of the ride, having worked on previous Universal attractions including Harry Potter and the Forbidden Journey, The Amazing Adventures of Spider-Man, and Shrek 4-D. Michael Bay, director of the Transformers film franchise, collaborated with Universal Creative on the ride, despite an earlier blog post that suggested otherwise: "I don't support it yet – I'm not involved and [I'm] not sure the story of the ride works, and I know Optimus is not going to just show up to be directed by some new people that have never worked with him," he wrote. Bay's involvement in the attraction's development was revealed by Mark Woodbury, president of Universal Creative, in an NBC documentary on Islands of Adventure's Wizarding World of Harry Potter. Industrial Light & Magic developed the special effects for the ride, having previously worked on Transformers, Transformers: Revenge of the Fallen and Transformers: Dark of the Moon. Each installation is reported to have cost US$100 million.

Special effects
As well as the motion-based vehicle, riders feel wind, water, hot air, fog, air blasts, vibration, and smoke.

Marketing
Initial promotion for the ride began with a blog by Resorts World Sentosa dedicated to the ride. Universal Studios Hollywood launched a website called Prepare For Battle. Universal Studios Hollywood also released a 30-minute documentary about the construction of the ride. Similar to Universal Studios Hollywood's marketing campaign, Universal Studios Florida utilised the same Prepare For Battle website as well as attaching another silhouette of Megatron to the Fairwinds Credit Union Tower in Downtown Orlando.

Reception
Unlike the Transformers movies, which got mixed-to-negative reviews, Transformers: The Ride has been praised by media around the world. Brady MacDonald of the Los Angeles Times said he had high expectations of the ride, and was very pleased with it, and wrote that it "ranks among the top theme park attractions in the world". Martin Miller, also of the Los Angeles Times, was equally pleased with the ride, and called it "one of Universal's most sophisticated, satisfying rides". Miller acknowledged the long queues associated with the ride but commended Universal for the design and theming of the queue to combat this. John Chan of CNET stated Transformers: The Ride "isn't as heart-stopping as a roller coaster [but] the (relatively) long 4-minute ride is every bit as entertaining". Florida Todays Tim Walters and Jennifer Sangalang stated the "action-packed 'Transformers' ride doesn't disappoint". Both praised the ride's "fun factor" giving it a rating of 5/5, with Walters and Sangalang giving ratings of 4 1/2 and 4 overall, respectively.

Bob Strauss from the Daily Breeze interviewed some park guests who had experienced the attraction. Their comments included "the 3-D's crazy; I think it's a step above where the other rides are so far" and "it's a new way of making these rides". News.com.au stated "the happy smiles on the faces of visitors as the exit ... say it all".

The opening of the ride at Universal Studios Hollywood was an immediate success, with record attendance over the Memorial Day weekend. A 15 percent rise in attendance in 2012 was attributed to the ride's opening. Within days of the ride's opening executives decided to install the ride at Universal Studios Florida with construction beginning almost immediately.

Transformers: The Ride was ranked in the Amusement Today'''s Golden Ticket Awards for best new ride of 2013 with 5% of the vote, to come in fifth place.

See also
 List of amusement rides based on film franchises
 2011 in amusement parks
 2012 in amusement parks
 2013 in amusement parks
 Pandora – The World of Avatar, a themed land at Disney's Animal Kingdom

References

External links

 Transformers: Prepare for Battle  – dedicated website for Transformers: The Ride at Universal Studios Hollywood and Florida
 Transformers: The Ride at the official Universal Studios Singapore website
 Official Blog  for Transformers: The Ride at Universal Studios Singapore
 Official Blog for Transformers: The Ride 3D at Universal Studios Hollywood 
 Official Blog for Transformers: The Ride-3D at Universal Studios Florida 
 Official Blog for Transformers: Battle for the AllSpark'' at Universal Studios Beijing

2011 3D films
2011 films
3D animated films
2010s science fiction films
Amusement rides based on film franchises
Amusement rides introduced in 2011
Amusement rides introduced in 2012
Amusement rides introduced in 2013
Amusement rides introduced in 2021
Amusement rides manufactured by Oceaneering International
Dark rides
Licensed properties at Universal Parks & Resorts
Simulator rides
Ride 3D
Universal Parks & Resorts attractions by name
Universal Parks & Resorts films
Universal Studios Hollywood
Universal Studios Singapore
Universal Studios Beijing
2013 establishments in Florida
3D animated short films
2011 establishments in Singapore
2012 establishments in California
2021 establishments in China
2010s American films